Fang Congyi (1302–1393), courtesy name Wuyu, sobriquets Fanghu, Bumang Daoren, Jinmen Yuke and Guigu Shanren, was a famed Chinese painter during the Yuan dynasty.

Fang was a native of Guixi, Jiangxi Province. In his youth he studied and became a Daoist priest, joining the Zhengyi Dao sect at his local temple. After the death of his principal instructor in the early 1340s, Fang traveled along the Yangtze River to the capital Khanbaliq, now Beijing. It was there that he began painting. He obtained a patron, and produced a number of works based on his travels. He primarily painted landscapes.

References

1302 births
1393 deaths
Yuan dynasty landscape painters
People from Yingtan
Painters from Jiangxi
Yuan dynasty Taoists